

Crystal Antlers was an American band from Long Beach, California.

History

Origins
The band started in late 2006 in Long Beach, California, as a 3-piece, Kevin Stuart (drums), Errol Davis (guitar) and Jonny Bell (bass/vocals). The three had met in high school music class and later worked together as chimney sweeps. Their first single was recorded at Closer Studio in San Francisco; "Parting Song For The Torn Sky" was later re-mixed for the band's first EP.

After the first single was recorded, Victor Rodriguez-Guerrero joined the band on organ. In 2007, Damian Edwards joined on percussion. A second single was released in 2007 under the label Backflip, out of Orange, California, produced by guitarist Michael Belfer, and recorded at Mama Jo's; this song, "Until The Sun Dies (Part 2)", was likewise later re-recorded for the EP.

Crystal Antlers EP, Tentacles, and Touch & Go Records (2008–2009)
In the fall of 2007, Crystal Antlers began recording its first EP, Crystal Antlers, with producer Ikey Owens, who had been making regular guest appearances with the band for several months. After the majority of the tracking was complete, guitarist Errol Davis left the band to pursue other interests and Andrew King joined. The EP was released in March 2008. In summer 2008 the band signed with the label Touch and Go records, who re-issued the EP with new art by Jefferson Mayday Mayday.

Tentacles, their debut LP, was released on April 7, 2009, as the last new release issued by Touch and Go. The band spent the rest of 2009 touring the US and Europe in support of the release.

2010
In the summer of 2009, organist Victor Rodriguez-Guerrero left the band and was replaced by Cora Foxx. In the fall of 2009 the band self-released a tape entitled Tapes Volume 1 Tentacles Era, featuring home recordings, previously unreleased demos and other rarities. The tape is to be the first in a series of very limited hand-made releases by the band.

In February 2010, the band briefly moved into a barn in La Punta Banda, Mexico, to begin writing for its next album, Two-Way Mirror, which was released in summer 2011.

2013
On October 15, the band released its third album, Nothing Is Real, on the boutique Los Angeles label Innovative Leisure.

Members
Current
Jonny Bell – bass, woodwinds, vocals
Andrew King – guitar
Kevin Stuart – drums

Former
Victor Rodriguez - organ
Errol Davis – guitar, organ
Cora Foxx - organ
Damian Edwards – percussion

Discography
Studio albums

Singles

Collections and compilations

References
Notes

External links
www.crystalantlers.com

Indie rock musical groups from California
Touch and Go Records artists
Musical groups from Los Angeles
Psychedelic rock music groups from California